Cinders is a 1920 American silent Western short film directed by Edward Laemmle and featuring Hoot Gibson.

Plot
As described in a film magazine, Bing (Gibson) fondly adores Joyce (Wood) and she really loves Bing, but is not into giving him any encouragement. One day Bing flirts with Stella, who is riding in a rail inspection car with her father, a railway company manager, which gets Joyce angry. Stella likes to do daredevil stunts and pranks, and when the train reaches the next railroad station she sends back a message to town that it has been held up. Bing gets the message from the railway agent and races to the scene. In the meantime, 'Wearie' Willie (Corey) is conducting an actual holdup, and Bing arrives in time to get the draw on him. The conductor, however, misconstrues the actions of Bing and fells him, allowing the real bandit to escape. Stella relents of her actions and trails Bing. Bing catches the bandit just as Stella arrives and, after some explanations, everything is cleared up.

Cast
 Hoot Gibson as 'Bing' Davidson
 Dorothy Wood as Joyce Raymond (credited as Dorothy Woods)
 Jim Corey as 'Wearie' Willie

See also
 List of American films of 1920
 Hoot Gibson filmography

References

External links

1920 films
1920 short films
American silent short films
American black-and-white films
Films directed by Edward Laemmle
1920s American films
1920s English-language films